The 1983 East Coast Conference men's basketball tournament was held March 7–12, 1983.  The champion gained and an automatic berth to the NCAA tournament.

Bracket and results

* denotes overtime game

References

East Coast Conference (Division I) men's basketball tournament
Tournament
1983 in sports in Pennsylvania
College basketball tournaments in Pennsylvania
Easton, Pennsylvania
March 1983 sports events in the United States